Stephen John Thorne (2 March 1935 – 26 May 2019) was a British actor of radio, film, stage, and television. He was best known for his regular BBC Radio 4 work and audiobook recordings, and for his portrayals of several Doctor Who villains, including the Time Lord Omega.

Early life 
Thorne was born in London in 1935 and brought up in Hesketh Bank, Lancashire, by adoptive parents, Alan Thorne, a vicar, and his wife Betty (née Boulton). He went to school at Liverpool College and then joined the Royal Navy for his national service. On demobilisation Thorne trained at the Royal Academy of Dramatic Art (RADA), a drama school situated in the Bloomsbury area of London, and graduated in 1957.

Career
He played several seasons with the Old Vic Company and the Royal Shakespeare Company in Stratford and London including a tour to Russia. He worked extensively in radio with over 2000 broadcasts for the BBC including as Uncle Mort in the Radio 4 comedy series Uncle Mort's North Country.

His television credits included Z-Cars, Crossroads, and Doctor Who. In Doctor Who, he played three major villains (Omega, Azal, and Eldrad), as well as an Ogron, before later playing the villainous Max in The Ghosts of N-Space, a Doctor Who BBC Radio story, in the mid 1990s. Also on radio, Thorne appeared as Aslan in The Magician's Nephew, as Treebeard in the Radio 4 adaptation of The Lord of the Rings, and also in their adaptation of Terry Pratchett's Guards! Guards! in which he portrayed Fred Colon (and also Death). He was also renowned for audio book narration. He also played the character of Lionheart in The Scarifyers following Nicholas Courtney's death.

Other television work included Death of an Expert Witness, David Copperfield, and Last of the Summer Wine. He voiced Aslan in the animated version of The Lion, the Witch and the Wardrobe. Thorne reprised the character on the BBC radio adaptation of the same name. He gave many poetry readings on radio, television, and tape and in venues from Westminster Abbey to various pubs.

He recorded over 300 unabridged audiobooks including children's stories which earned critical acclaim in both the UK and the US. Awards included a Talkies Award 1996 for Enigma by Robert Harris and several Golden Earphones Awards from Audiofile Magazine.

Personal life
While training at RADA Thorne met fellow student Barbara Sykes, and they married in 1958.

On 26 May 2019, Thorne died, at the age of 84. He is survived by his wife, and their two sons, Simon and Crispian.

Filmography

References

External links

1935 births
2019 deaths
Audiobook narrators
Royal Shakespeare Company members
Male actors from Derbyshire
People from Derby
British male film actors
British male television actors
British male stage actors
Alumni of RADA
20th-century English male actors
21st-century English male actors
Male actors from London